The Pulitzer Prize for Beat Reporting was presented from 1991 to 2006 for a distinguished example of beat reporting characterized by sustained and knowledgeable coverage of a particular subject or activity. 

From 1985 to 1990 it was known as the Pulitzer Prize for Specialized Reporting.

For 2007, the category was dropped in favor of a Pulitzer Prize for Local Reporting, with the Pulitzer Prize Board noting that "the work of beat reporters remains eligible for entry in a wide range of categories that include—depending on the specialty involved—national, investigative, and explanatory reporting, as well as the new local category."

Pulitzer Prize for Specialized Reporting
1985: Randall Savage and Jackie Crosby of the Macon Telegraph and News, for their in-depth examination of academics and athletics at the University of Georgia and the Georgia Institute of Technology.
1986: Andrew Schneider and Mary Pat Flaherty of Pittsburgh Press, for their investigation of violations and failures in the organ transplantation system in the United States.
1987: Alex S. Jones of The New York Times, for The Fall of the House of Bingham, a skillful and sensitive report of a powerful newspaper family's bickering and how it led to the sale of a famed media empire.
1988: Walt Bogdanich of The Wall Street Journal, for his chilling series of reports on faulty testing by American medical laboratories.
1989: Edward Humes of the Orange County Register, for his in-depth reporting on the military establishment in Southern California.
1990: Tamar Stieber of Albuquerque Journal, For persistent reporting that linked a rare blood disorder to an over-the-counter dietary supplement, L-Tryptophan, and led to a national recall of the product.

Pulitzer Prize for Beat Reporting
 1991: Natalie Angier, The New York Times, for her compelling and illuminating reports on a variety of scientific topics.
 1992: Deborah Blum, The Sacramento Bee, for her series, "The Monkey Wars," which explored the complex ethical and moral questions surrounding primate research.
 1993: Paul Ingrassia and Joseph B. White, The Wall Street Journal, for often exclusive coverage of General Motors' management turmoil.
 1994: Eric Freedman and Jim Mitzelfeld, The Detroit News, for dogged reporting that disclosed flagrant spending abuses at Michigan's House Fiscal Agency.
 1995: David Shribman, The Boston Globe, for his analytical reporting on Washington developments and the national scene.
 1996: Bob Keeler, Newsday, for his detailed portrait of a progressive local Catholic parish and its parishioners.
 1997: Byron Acohido, The Seattle Times, for his coverage of the aerospace industry, notably an exhaustive investigation of rudder control problems on the Boeing 737, which contributed to new FAA requirements for major improvements.
 1998: Linda Greenhouse, The New York Times, for her consistently illuminating coverage of the United States Supreme Court.
 1999: Chuck Philips and Michael A. Hiltzik, Los Angeles Times, for their stories on corruption in the entertainment industry, including a charity sham sponsored by the National Academy of Recording Arts and Sciences, illegal detoxification programs for wealthy celebrities, and a resurgence of radio payola.
 2000: George Dohrmann, Saint Paul Pioneer Press, for his determined reporting, despite negative reader reaction, that revealed academic fraud in the men's basketball program at the University of Minnesota.
 2001: David Cay Johnston, The New York Times, for his penetrating and enterprising reporting that exposed loopholes and inequities in the U.S. tax code, which was instrumental in bringing about reforms.
 2002: Gretchen Morgenson, The New York Times, for her trenchant and incisive Wall Street coverage.
 2003: Diana K. Sugg, The Baltimore Sun, for her absorbing, often poignant stories that illuminated complex medical issues through the lives of people.
 2004: Daniel Golden, The Wall Street Journal, for his compelling and meticulously documented stories on admission preferences given to the children of alumni and donors at American universities.
2005: Amy Dockser Marcus, The Wall Street Journal, for her masterly stories about patients, families and physicians that illuminated the often unseen world of cancer survivors.
2006: Dana Priest, The Washington Post, for her persistent, painstaking reports on secret “black site” prisons and other controversial features of the government’s counterterrorism campaign.

References

Beat Reporting
Awards established in 1985 
Awards established in 1991 
Awards disestablished in 2006
1985 establishments in the United States